Arthur Kutscher (17 July 1878 in Hannover – 29 August 1960 in Munich) was a German historian of literature and researcher in drama. Together with Max Herrmann he can be seen as a founding father of theatre studies in Germany. He was a professor at Munich University, where he taught a famous seminar in theatre history.  Kutscher was a friend of the iconoclastic dramatist and cabaret-star Frank Wedekind. His work influenced many playwrights, poets, and directors. His students included Bertolt Brecht (studied in 1917), Erwin Piscator (studied in 1913), Peter Hacks, Hanns Johst, Klabund, and Erich Mühsam. Brecht's first full-length play, Baal (written 1918), was written in response to an argument in one of Kutscher's drama seminars. While Kutscher was responsible for inspiring an admiration for Wedekind in the young Brecht, he was "bitterly critical" of Brecht's own early dramatic writings.

Works
 Frank Wedekind, sein Leben und seine Werke. With plates, including portraits (Frank Wedekind, his Life and his Work), 1922 Record on Amazon.co.uk
 Grundriss der Theaterwissenschaft (Compendium of Dramatics), 2 Vols., 1932-1937
 Stilkunde des deutschen Dichtung (Stylistics of German Fiction), 1949
 Der Theaterprofessor (The Theatre Professor), 1960 (autobiography)

References

Works cited
 Thomson, Peter. 1994. "Brecht's Lives". In The Cambridge Companion to Brecht. Ed. Peter Thomson and Glendyr Sacks. Cambridge Companions to Literature Ser. Cambridge: Cambridge University Press. 22-39. .
 Willett, John. 1967. The Theatre of Bertolt Brecht: A Study from Eight Aspects. Third rev. ed. London: Methuen, 1977. .
 ---. 1978. The Theatre of Erwin Piscator: Half a Century of Politics in the Theatre. London: Methuen. .
 Willett, John and Ralph Manheim. 1970. Introduction. In Collected Plays: One by Bertolt Brecht. Ed. John Willett and Ralph Manheim. Bertolt Brecht: Plays, Poetry and Prose Ser. London: Methuen. . p.vii-xvii.

External links 
 

1878 births
1960 deaths
20th-century German historians
German philologists
German theatre critics
Theatrologists
Writers from Hanover
Commanders Crosses of the Order of Merit of the Federal Republic of Germany
German male non-fiction writers